Rock 'n' Roll is a video game for the Commodore 64, Atari ST, Amiga, MS-DOS, ZX Spectrum, and Amstrad CPC, published by Rainbow Arts in 1989. The idea for the game and the programming are by Frank Prasse. The Soundtrack for the Amiga version was composed by Chris Huelsbeck.

The titles comes from both the aspect of rolling the ball along the level, and the various Rock and roll-inspired tunes that play during gameplay.

Gameplay
Rock 'n' Roll is an action-oriented puzzle game with 32 levels (plus a secret bonus level). The player controls a ball (steered with the mouse on the Amiga or the joystick on the Commodore 64) and his job is to reach the exit on each level.

Numerous objects help or hinder the player's path to the exit. These include locked doors that he needs to find a key to, ice which hinders his steering, fans that push him away or magnets that pull him towards them, crumbling floor tiles, and others. A map of the level is accessible at any time, but it starts out completely blank. The player has to collect eyes along the level to make various objects visible on the map.
He may also buy various supplies like a fastball, a spikeball, bombs, and even hints for game secrets like extra money, extra lives and short cuts.

Reception

"With this title, Rainbow Arts has given proof again, that also simple game ideas can result in complex, entertaining programs."
Torsten Oppermann in ASM issue 11/1989

See also
Enigma
Oxyd
Rollin

References

External links

Game Map

1989 video games
Amiga games
Amstrad CPC games
Atari ST games
Commodore 64 games
DOS games
Marble games
Video games scored by Barry Leitch
Video games scored by Chris Huelsbeck
Video games developed in Germany
ZX Spectrum games
Rainbow Arts games
Multiplayer and single-player video games